Arturo Chacón Cruz (August 20, 1977) is a Mexican American operatic tenor. A winner of the Operalia competition in 2005, he went on to sing leading roles at many North American opera theatres, including Los Angeles Opera, Washington National Opera, San Francisco Opera, Carnegie Hall, and Houston Grand Opera. He has also appeared in many European opera houses, including the Teatro Real in Madrid, La Fenice in Venice, Bolshoi Theatre, Arena di Verona, Teatro alla Scala, the Theater an der Wien in Vienna and the Berlin State Opera.

Career
Chacón Cruz was born in Ciudad Obregon and raised in Navojoa, and Hermosillo Sonora. A graduate of the prestigious Houston Grand Opera Studio, he also graduated from other institutions like SIVAM workshops, the Boston University's Opera Institute, and San Francisco Opera's Merola Opera Program.

His Palacio de Bellas Artes debut (Mexico City) was in 1999, in the "III Gala Latina", and he has returned several times to that stage for concerts and Opera. He made his Carnegie Hall debut in March 2002 singing in Mozart's Coronation Mass. He returned to Carnegie Hall in June 2003 to sing Beethoven's Mass in C major and Charpentier's Te Deum with the New England Symphonic Ensemble. He performed at the Halla again in 2006, in a concert with The New York Pops.

He made his debut with the San Francisco Symphony Orchestra in July 2004, as part of the "Summer in the City" concert series. In September 2005 he sang a concert of Mexican songs and Spanish music with the Houston Symphony Orchestra. He debuted with the Montreal Symphony Orchestra in 2008, under the baton of Maestro Kent Nagano, performing the tenor solo in the Verdi Requiem during the Lanaudière Festival in Joliette. In 2010, he made his Chinese debut in Beijing, under the baton of Maestro Lorin Maazel, singing Alfredo in La traviata.

He made his Teatro alla Scala debut in 2012, singing the title role in The Tales of Hoffmann, by Offenbach.

Reception
Chacón Cruz has received many awards, including the Antonio Davalos Award in Mexico's Carlo Morelli's competition, first place and the Audience Choice Award at the 2003 Eleanor McCollum Competition in Houston Grand Opera, winner of Metropolitan Opera National Council Auditions in the New England Region, Plácido Domingo's Operalia 2005. He was also the recipient of the Ramón Vargas Opera Grant given by Vargas and Pro Ópera in Mexico. In 2006, he was named Artist of the Year by El Imparcial Cultural Organization in his hometown of Hermosillo, Mexico. Most recently he received the Moncayo Medal in Guadalajara, he was GQ Magazine Mexico “Man of the Year” for Classical Music Award recipient in 2018, San Francisco Opera Manetti-Shrem  Emerging Star Award in 2017.

He has been acclaimed for his portrayal of Rodolfo in La Bohème, due to the youthfulness, beauty, and power of his voice, as well as his sincere interpretation of the role.

Repertoire
Some of his tenor roles include:
Arcadio in Daniel Catán's Florencia en el Amazonas,
Rodolfo in La bohème,
Pinkerton in Madama Butterfly,
Rinuccio in Gianni Schicchi,
Ruggero in La Rondine,
Lensky in Tchaikovsky's Eugene Onegin,
Alfredo in La traviata,
Il Duca di Mantova in Verdi'''s Rigoletto,
The Tenor solo in the Verdi Requiem,
Romeo and Faust in Gounod's Roméo et Juliette and Faust,
Christian in Alfano's Cyrano de Bergerac,
The title role in Mozart's Idomeneo,
Tamino in The Magic Flute,
Marcello di Bruges in Donizetti's Il duca d'Alba,
Nemorino in Gaetano Donizetti's l'Elisir d'Amore,
Des Grieux in Massenet's Manon,
the title role in Werther,
the title role in Les Contes d'Hoffmann,
Uriel in Haydn's The Creation.
Sir Edgardo di Ravenswood in Lucia de LammermoorVenues
Teatro alla Scala, Milano
Washington National Opera,
Houston Grand Opera,
National Centre for the Performing Arts, Beijing, China,
Opera Pacific,
Berlin Staatsoper Unter den Linden,
Detroit Opera,
The Keller Auditorium with The Portland Opera,
Los Angeles Opera,
Grazer Oper, Austria,
Oper Köln, Germany,
Hamburgische Staatsoper, Hamburg, Germany,
Teatro Comunale di Bologna,
Teatro di San Carlo,
Connecticut Opera,
Cincinnati Opera,
Palau de les Arts Reina Sofía, Spain,
Palacio de Bellas Artes, in Mexico,
Teatro de la Ciudad, in Mexico City,
Sala Nezahualcoyotl, in Mexico City,
Teatro Real in Madrid,
Teatro La Fenice in Venice,
Teatro Regio di Torino, in Turin,
Vatroslav Lisinski Concert Hall, Zagreb, Croatia,
Opéra National de Montpellier and Festival de Radio France,
the National Theatre of Miskolc in Hungary,
Carnegie Hall, New York City,
the Mormon Tabernacle Choir in Salt Lake City,
Le Corum: Montpellier France,
Opera de Lyon, Lyon, France,
Opera Royal de Wallonie, Liege, Belgium,
National Centre for the Performing Arts (China),
Aichi Triennale Festival, Nagoya, Japan
Teatro Campoamor, Oviedo, España

Recordings
Marcello di Bruges, "Il duca d'Alba"
Christian, Cyrano de Bergerac, DVD Release by Naxos Records
Featured in Renée Fleming's Verismo CD
A Christmas Wonderland CD
De México Para El Mundo CD
Arturo Chacon Le Canta A México CD
De Mi Casa A Tu Casa CD
Hallelujah Leonard Cohen (Cover, Single)

Philanthropy
Since 2018, Chacón Cruz has served as the ambassador for Beyond Celiac, formerly known as the National Foundation of Celiac Awareness, to help spread awareness about celiac disease. He performed at their 2019 Gala.

References

Anabitarte, Ana (June 10, 2005). "Llega a final de Operalia tenor mexicano". El UniversalKennicott, Philip (November 6, 2006). "A 'Madama Butterfly' With Pipes, if Not Legs". The Washington PostMetropolitan Opera National Council Auditions (2003). Biography: Arturo Chacón-Cruz
Midgette, Anne (September 15, 2008 ). "'Traviata': It's a Start". The Washington Post''
Westphal, Matthew (September 11, 2007). "Tenor Pulls Out of LA Opera's Verdi Requiem at Short Notice as Replacement Jets Cross-Country". Playbill Arts.

External links

1977 births
Living people
Operalia, The World Opera Competition prize-winners
Boston University College of Fine Arts alumni
21st-century Mexican male opera singers
Mexican operatic tenors